John Hendrickson Berg (January 12, 1932 – October 11, 2015) was an American art director best known for his works at Columbia Records. Throughout his career, he won four Grammy Awards out of twenty-six nominations.

Biography
Berg was born in Brooklyn and grew up in the Flatbush neighborhood, where he attended Erasmus Hall High School. While in high school, Berg drew cartoons for the school newspaper. Upon graduation, he took classes at the Cooper Union. After earning his degree, he worked for Doyle Dane Bernbach and Esquire. Berg was hired by Columbia Records in 1961 and retired from the label with the title of vice president in 1985. In two and a half decades with Columbia, Berg designed five Grammy Award-winning album covers: The Barbra Streisand Album in 1964, Bob Dylan's Greatest Hits in 1968, Underground in 1969, Chicago X in 1977, and Love Notes in 1978. He died of pneumonia in Southampton, New York on October 11, 2015, aged 83.

References

External links

1932 births
2015 deaths
Deaths from pneumonia in New York (state)
People from Flatbush, Brooklyn
Erasmus Hall High School alumni
Cooper Union alumni
American art directors
Columbia Records
Esquire (magazine)
Grammy Award winners